Elle Ramirez (born in Rodriguez, Rizal, Philippines) is a Filipina actress, model, and dancer. She started her acting career when she joined Protégé: The Battle For The Big Artista Break.

Career
Ramirez auditioned for the Season 2 of GMA's reality-based talent show Protégé, where she became the protégé of singer and actress Jolina Magdangal. But due to the show's twist of events, her mentor Jolina has to let her go and award-winning actress Gina Alajar became her new mentor, and by October 21, 2012 she became one of the runners-up, along with Zandra Summer, Mikoy Morales and Ruru Madrid, while Thea Tolentino and Jeric Gonzales were pronounced the Season 2 ultimate winners.

In 2013, after her debut in Protégé, Ramirez was cast in the fantasy-drama series Pyra: Babaeng Apoy, together with her co-Protégé stars Thea Tolentino, Jeric Gonzales, Zandra Summer, and veteran actresses Angelu de Leon and Gladys Reyes. Since then, she had been cast in various TV series and anthologies throughout her career.

Filmography

Television

Movies

References

External links

Living people
Filipino child actresses
Filipino film actresses
Filipino television actresses
People from Rodriguez, Rizal
Actresses from Rizal
Tagalog people
Year of birth missing (living people)
Participants in Philippine reality television series
Protégé (TV series) participants
GMA Network personalities